The  is one of five active Armies of the Japan Ground Self-Defense Force.  It is headquartered in Kumamoto, Kumamoto Prefecture. Its responsibility is the defense of Kyūshū and Okinawa.

Organization 

  Western Army, in Kumamoto
  4th Division, in Kasuga, responsible for the defense of the Fukuoka, Nagasaki, Ōita and Saga prefectures
  8th Division, in Kumamoto, responsible for the defense of the Kagoshima, Kumamoto and Miyazaki prefectures
  15th Brigade, in Naha, responsible for the defense of Okinawa Prefecture
 2nd Anti-Aircraft Artillery Brigade, in Iizuka
 3rd Anti-Aircraft Artillery Group, in Iizuka (Type 03 Chū-SAM, MIM-23 Hawk)
 7th Anti-Aircraft Artillery Group, in Ōmura (Type 03 Chū-SAM, MIM-23 Hawk)
 304th Observation Battery, in Iizuka
 5th Engineer Brigade, in Ogōri
 2nd Engineer Group (Construction), in Iizuka
 9th Engineer Group (Construction), in Ogōri
 103rd Equipment Company, in Ogōri
 303rd Amphibious Company, in Ogōri
 305th Vehicle Company, in Ogōri
 Western Army Combined (Training) Brigade, in Kurume
 19th Infantry Regiment, in Kasuga
 24th Infantry Regiment, in Ebino
 5th Basic Training Battalion, in Kurume
 113th Training Battalion, in Kirishima
 118th Training Battalion, in Kurume
 Western Army Artillery, in Yufu
 5th Surface-to-Surface Missile Regiment, in Kumamoto (Type 12 Surface-to-Ship Missile)
 132nd Special Artillery Battalion, in Yufu (M270 Multiple Launch Rocket System)
 302nd Observation Battery, in Yufu
 Western Army Field Artillery Regiment, in Kumamoto
 1st Artillery Battalion, in Kumamoto, with two batteries of FH-70 155mm towed howitzers
 2nd Artillery Battalion, in Kusu, with two batteries of FH-70 155mm towed howitzers
 3rd Artillery Battalion, in Ebino, with two batteries of FH-70 155mm towed howitzers
 4th Artillery Battalion, in Kurume, with three batteries of FH-70 155mm towed howitzers
 Western Army Aviation Group, in Mashiki
 3rd Anti-tank Helicopter Battalion, in Mashiki
 Western Army Helicopter Battalion, in Mashiki
 Western Army Meteorological Company, in Mashiki
 Logistic Support Battalion, in Mashiki
 Western Army Logistic Support Troops, in Yoshinogari
 Western Army Signal Group, in Kumamoto
 Western Army Medical Service, in Kumamoto
 Western Army Military Intelligence, in Kumamoto
 Kyūshū Logistic Depot, in Yoshinogari

History 

In August 2010, a proposal was being considered by the then Japanese government to convert a conventional [battalion strength] regiment from either the 8th Division or the 15th Brigade into a "US-style" amphibious unit, effectively giving the Western Army a battalion of marines for dealing with contingencies. This proposal seems have been shelved or fallen into limbo in the interim.

As of June 2013, as part of an ongoing expansion of defense capabilities in the Western Army's area of responsibility, the MOD were considering creating a special "isle assault unit", whose role would be the recapture of remote Japanese islands that had been invaded by a foreign power., It would share this mission with the pre-existing Western Army Infantry Regiment, itself currently undergoing an expansion in manpower and equipment (e.g. increase in authorised strength to 680 effectives, & adding (initially 4) AAVP-7A1's to its TOE). Equipment for the new unit on the other hand, may ultimately include the Maneuver Combat Vehicle and the Light-weight Combat Vehicle (LCV) System, both of which were designed in part with the remote island defence mission in mind.

If stood up, the new unit together with the WAIR would form a major part of the Western Army's first response to a hostile incursion in the more remote parts of its AOR. In early September 2015, plans for the creation of the new unit, now referred to as an 'amphibious mobile unit' were confirmed. The new unit is to be stood up by the end of FY2017, with a training corps to be set up in the interim (by the end of FY2016).

In 2013 troops from the Western Army Infantry Regiment deployed from the JS Hyuga and JS Shimokita for an amphibious warfare exercise in California.

On 29 March 2021, a JGSDF electronic warfare unit was raised at Camp Kengun.

Other Developments
Under current plans, the Western Army will have priority on deliveries of the new Type 12 Surface-to-Ship Missile upgrade (six sets on order to date [July 2013]). The Type 12 will be initially deployed with the 5th Anti-Ship Missile Regiment, but ultimately the 6th Anti-Ship Missile Regiment (deactivated 21 April 2011) may be reactivated to operate the new systems.

Note: GSDF Anti-Ship Missile Regiments are alternatively known as Surface-to-Surface Missile Regiments.

References

External links 
 Western Army home page ( in Japanese)

Armies of the Japan Ground Self-Defense Force
Military units and formations established in 1955
1955 establishments in Japan